Wormley Rovers Football Club is a football club based in Wormley, Hertfordshire.

History
The club was founded in 1921 and moved to Wormley Playing Fields in 1954. They joined the Hertfordshire Senior County League in 1976 and won Division Three in their first season. They were promoted to Division One in 1981 and the Premier Division in 1987. They were relegated two years later but returned to the Premier Division in 1992, and remained there for 26 years before successfully applying to join the new Division One South of the Eastern Counties Football League for the 2018–19 season.

Current squad

Honours
Herts Senior County League
Division One champions 1986–87
Division Three champions 1976–77

References

External links
Official site

Association football clubs established in 1921
Football clubs in England
Football clubs in Hertfordshire
Hertfordshire Senior County League
Eastern Counties Football League
1921 establishments in England